Judds Falls, also known as Tekaharawa Falls, is a waterfall located northeast of the Village of Cherry Valley, New York on the Canajoharie Creek.

References

Waterfalls of New York (state)
Landforms of Otsego County, New York
Tourist attractions in Otsego County, New York